Golden Gate is a 1997 adventure video game developed by iX Entertainment and published by Panasonic Interactive Media. A 3DO Interactive Multiplayer version was in development but never released.

Plot 
The protagonist explores San Francisco while searching for hidden treasure. Gameplay plays with a classic point and click interface, with inventory-based puzzles and dialogue sequences to advance the story.

Critical reception 
Game Revolution didn't recommend it to puzzle adventure gamers. CD Mag called it a diamond in the rough. PC Game World deemed it tiresome and forgettable. Coming Soon Magazine thought the film's visual style would be copied by other games. Gamezlla praised the artwork, plot, and musical score. Electric Playground thought the gameplay was uninspired and slow. Four Fat Chicks described the game as old-fashioned. The Adrenaline Vault criticized the gameplay. Just Adventure criticized the tone while enjoying the experience of exploring San Francisco. Mac Gamer thought the music was the best part of the game. Quandary didn't think the game was good in terms of gameplay and narrative.

References

External links 
 Game Revolution review

1997 video games
Adventure games
Cancelled 3DO Interactive Multiplayer games
Classic Mac OS games
Video games developed in the United States
Video games set in San Francisco
Windows games